Mahadevapura Assembly constituency is one of the 224 constituencies in the Karnataka Legislative Assembly of Karnataka a south state of India. It is also part of Bangalore Central Lok Sabha constituency. The constituency is represented by PC Mohan, Member of Parliament from the Bangalore Central Lok Sabha constituency.

Member of Legislative Assembly

See also
 Bangalore Urban district
 List of constituencies of Karnataka Legislative Assembly

References

Assembly constituencies of Karnataka
Bangalore Urban district